Andy Warhol's Velvet Underground featuring Nico is a compilation album of the Velvet Underground released by MGM Records in 1971 that features selections from the band's first three studio albums. Originally released as a double LP, the cover artwork and inside gatefold sleeve feature imitations of Andy Warhol's paintings of Coca-Cola bottles, but are credited to other artists on the back sleeve of the album. The album was released in the UK to capitalise on the interest from Warhol's Pork.

Track listing
All songs written by Lou Reed unless otherwise noted.

Disc 1

Disc 2

Personnel
Adapted from liner notes:

The Velvet Underground
 Lou Reed - vocals, guitar, piano
 John Cale - vocals, electric viola, organ, bass guitar
 Sterling Morrison - vocals, guitar, bass guitar
 Maureen Tucker - percussion

Note: Doug Yule is not credited, although he provides lead vocals on "Candy Says", as well as bass guitar on "Pale Blue Eyes" and "Beginning to See the Light", as he replaced John Cale on the band's third album. Original pressings of the album misspell Sterling Morrison's name as "Stirling Morrison".

Production

 Illustration, Design, Art Direction – Grahame Berney, Keith Davis, Oliver Wade
 Liner Notes – Russ Curry

References

Nico albums
The Velvet Underground compilation albums
1970 compilation albums
MGM Records compilation albums
Albums produced by Tom Wilson (record producer)
Albums produced by Andy Warhol
Albums produced by Doug Yule
Albums produced by Sterling Morrison
Albums produced by John Cale
Albums produced by Lou Reed
Albums produced by Maureen Tucker